Fiji competed for the eighth time at the 1966 British Commonwealth Games in Christchurch, New Zealand. A team of thirty-six athletes (27 men and 9 women) and ten officials (9 men and 1 woman) was sent to the 1974 Games.

Fijian competitors competed in athletics (10 men & 5 women), boxing (8 men), lawn bowls (7 men), swimming (1 man & 4 women), and weightlifting (1 man). No medals were won.

Two swimmers representing Fiji were from New Zealand, sisters Jane and Rebecca Perrott; their father was Registrar at the University of the South Pacific. At 12½ Rebecca was the youngest competitor at the games.Lasarusa Waqa also represented Fiji in the 100 and 400 mtrs.

Medals

References

Sources
 Fiji results for the 1974 Games, Commonwealth Games Federation

Nations at the 1974 British Commonwealth Games
Commonwealth Games
1974